The Arizona Wildcats men's basketball team is the intercollegiate men's basketball program representing the University of Arizona in Tucson, Arizona. They compete in the Pac-12 Conference of NCAA Division I and is currently coached by Tommy Lloyd.
 
The program came to national prominence under the tenure (1983–2007) of former head coach Lute Olson, who established the program as among America's elite in college basketball. One writer referred to U of A as "Point Guard U" because the school has produced successful guards like Steve Kerr, Damon Stoudamire, Khalid Reeves, Mike Bibby, Jason Terry, Gilbert Arenas, Jason Gardner, Jerryd Bayless, and T. J. McConnell, among others.

From 1985 to 2009, the Arizona basketball team reached the NCAA Division I tournament for 25 consecutive years, two years shy of North Carolina's record with 27. Despite having their 1999 and 2008 appearances later vacated by the NCAA, the media still cites Arizona's streak, and simply notes the changes. The Wildcats have reached the Final Four of the NCAA tournament on four occasions (1988, 1994, 1997, and 2001). They have also made two appearances in the National Championship (won over Kentucky Wildcats in 1997, lost to Duke Blue Devils in 2001). In Pac-10 play, former head coach Lute Olson currently holds the record for most wins as a Pac-10 coach with 327. In addition, the team has won 17 Pac-10/12 regular season championship titles and 9 Pac-10/12 tournament championship titles.  Arizona also holds the distinction of recording five out of the seven 17–1 Pac-10 seasons (one-loss seasons). In 2022 Arizona became the first team in conference history to win 18 conference games in a season.  No team has gone undefeated since the formation of the Pac-10/12.

Arizona has spent 37 weeks at No. 1 in the AP Poll, which is ninth-most all-time; 29 weeks at No. 2, tied for eighth all-time; 164 weeks in the Top 5, seventh all-time; 328 weeks in the Top 10, sixth all-time; and 586 weeks in the top 25, seventh all-time.

Team history

Early years (1904–1925) 
The University of Arizona fielded its first men's basketball team in 1904–05. Orin Albert Kates coached the team and drew opponents from local YMCAs. The first game Arizona played ended in a 40–32 victory over the Morenci YMCA.

In 1914, Arizona's first famous coach, James Fred "Pop" McKale was lured away from a teaching and coaching job at Tucson High School to take over as Athletic Director and coach basketball, football, baseball and track.  McKale took things to a new level, posting a 9–0 record his first season as a basketball coach.  Moreover, McKale elevated the program to intercollegiate play.  While basketball was his least favorite of the many sports he coached while at U of A, he chalked up three undefeated seasons and a career-winning average of .803, which has never been bested by a U of A coach who has held the post for at least three years.  The McKale Memorial Center, the main arena for Arizona basketball, is named in his honor.

Fred Enke era 

From 1925 to 1961, the program was under the stewardship of Fred Enke, U of A's longest-tenured coach. Coach Fred A. Enke was responsible for the early successes of Wildcat basketball. Enke amassed 509 wins in his tenure on the U of A sidelines and still ranks as the second-winningest coach in school history, winning more than 60 percent of his games. Enke also led the Cats to the first four postseason appearances (3 N.I.T./1 NCAA) in school history and in 1950–51 competed in both the N.I.T. and NCAA postseason tournaments. Finally, he was the first coach to lead Arizona to a national ranking. Two of his teams (1950, 1951) finished the season ranked in the top 15.

Under Enke, U of A competed in the now-defunct Border Conference. Under Enke's direction, Arizona won 12 conference championships, including a span in which the Cats won or shared seven consecutive Border
Conference titles (1942–51). No Border Conference team won as many league games (231) or overall contests (398) during its membership. In 1962, Arizona joined the Western Athletic Conference as a founding member after the Border Conference disbanded.

Bruce Larson era 
Bruce Larson, a player and assistant under Enke before coaching at Eastern Arizona and Weber State, coached the Wildcats from 1961 to 1971, leading the school to a 136–148 record. Under his tenure, major planning began for a larger and more modern basketball arena (which would become McKale Center) to replace the outdated Bear Down Gymnasium. Larson would later serve as an analyst on Wildcat football and basketball telecasts during the Lute Olson (and Dick Tomey) era.

Fred Snowden era 
In 1972, Fred Snowden was hired as the head basketball coach, making Arizona the second Division I school and the first major program to hire an African American head coach.  Known as "The Fox", Snowden brought the excitement back to Wildcat basketball during his 10 years on the Arizona sideline, averaging more than 80 points per game in six of his 10 years and topping the 100-point barrier 27 times.  Snowden led Arizona to the NCAA tournament twice, in 1976 and 1977, getting as far as the Elite Eight in 1976 before losing to UCLA 82–66, a game after defeating UNLV in a Sweet Sixteen matchup. During the 1976 tournament, he also logged Arizona's first and only tournament wins until Lute Olson's hiring, beating John Thompson's Georgetown team 83–76. Snowden's 1976 team also won the school's only WAC championship title on a buzzer-beater by Gilbert Myles verses New Mexico, with the help of the spectacular play of Bob Elliott, Jim Rappis, and Al Fleming. In 1978, Coach Snowden helped transition the basketball program over to the newly formed Pac-10. Snowden could not sustain success in the Pac-10, however, finishing no higher than 4th place in the conference. His 9–18 final season led U of A to look for a replacement.

Known for his high-octane offense and remembered as a trailblazer, Fred "The Fox" Snowden brought excitement to Arizona basketball during his 10-year tenure as the program's head coach. Snowden, who led the Wildcats from 1972 to 1982, was the first African-American head basketball coach at an NCAA Division I institution, amassing a 167–108 mark. The 1973 Western Athletic Conference Coach of the Year, his career winning percentage of .607 has been topped by only three U of A coaches since 1924. Nicknamed "The Fox" due to his cool demeanor, Snowden led Arizona to three postseason berths, including the 1975 National Commissioners’ Invitational Tournament and the 1976 and 1977 NCAA Tournaments. His best season came in 1976, when the Wildcats went 24–9, won the Western Athletic Conference championship and advanced to the NCAA West Regional Final. The Brewton, Ala., native was the head coach who led Arizona into the Pac-10 in the 1978–79 season, guiding the program for its first four seasons in the Conference. Snowden also oversaw the transition into the McKale Center after its opening in 1973. He was inducted into the Arizona Sports Hall of Fame in 1988. Prior to his role at Arizona, Snowden was an assistant coach at Michigan. He also served on the coaching staff of his high school, Northwestern High School in Detroit, Mich., where he coached for five years after attending Wayne State University from 1954 to 1958. Snowden died in 1994 at the age of 57.

Athletic Director Dave Strack brought in Ben Lindsey to replace Fred Snowden in 1983, and on the surface, it seemed like a reasonable move. Lindsey had junior college expertise, having had a successful career at Grand Canyon University, where he won two national titles.  What resulted, however, was nothing short of disaster. The 1983 team finished with the worst season in school history at 4–24, with only one Pac-10 win.

Lute Olson era

Early years 
Newly hired U of A Athletic director Cedric Dempsey fired Lindsey after only one season and hired University of Iowa coach Lute Olson as his successor.  U of A needed a coach with a history of quickly turning around programs, which Olson had done previously at Iowa.  "I knew we had a tremendous amount of work to do", Olson recalled in a recent interview with Tucson Lifestyle.  "The program was in shambles at that point, after the terrible year before..."

Under Olson, Arizona quickly rose to national prominence. Arizona won its first Pac-10 title in 1986, only three years after his arrival.  That season set up an amazing 1987–88 season, which included taking the Great Alaska Shootout championship, the Valley Bank Fiesta Bowl Classic championship and the Pac-10 championship.  Under players Steve Kerr, Kenny Lofton, and Sean Elliott, Arizona spent much of the season ranked No. 1 and made their first (and Olson's second) Final Four.  While Arizona lost in the Final Four round, their play put the program on the map and launched Arizona's reign as a perennial Pac-10 and NCAA tournament contender. Sean Elliott was awarded the John R. Wooden Award on the season and would set the PAC-10 scoring record.

In 1997, Arizona defeated the University of Kentucky, the defending national champions, to win the NCAA national championship. Prior to winning the championship in 1997, Arizona stormed back from 10-point deficits in the Southeast Regional First round and Second Round against #13 South Alabama and #12 College of Charleston, respectively winning 65–57 and 73–69. The Southeast Regional semifinal pitted against overall #1 Kansas (34–1) which had defeated Arizona the year before in the 1996 West Regional semifinal. However, Arizona came out fast and stunned the Jayhawks 85–82, then prevailed in overtime against Providence 96–92 in the Elite Eight to clinch a berth in the Final Four. Arizona then beat #1 seed North Carolina 66–58 in the Final Four, which turned out to be Dean Smith's last game as a coach. Arizona also accomplished the unprecedented feat of beating three number one seeds in the 1997 NCAA Division I men's basketball tournament. This feat has never been accomplished by another team.

The year following the Championship season, 1998, Arizona returned all 5 starters (Mike Bibby, Michael Dickerson, Miles Simon, Bennett Davison, and A. J. Bramlett) and were poised to make another run after receiving the #1 overall seed in the West, but were upset by Utah in the Elite 8.

In 1999, all 5 starters were lost to graduation or early entry to the NBA draft and Arizona's hopes of continuing its streak of consecutive trips to the NCAA tournament was in jeopardy until senior point guard Jason Terry (the 6th man the previous two seasons) elevated his game (receiving National Player of the Year honors) and continued the school's amazing streak.

1999 NCAA sanctions under Olson 
In 2000, former Wildcat Jason Terry, stated that he received approximately $4,500 in cash, checks and wire transfers from New York sports agent Larry Fox, after his junior season. The NCAA announced that as a result a one-game 1999 NCAA tournament appearance was formally vacated. In addition, Arizona asked Terry to repay the $45,363 in forfeited NCAA 1999 tournament revenue and banned him from the U of A Sports Hall of Fame, including a provision that his jersey would not be retired. Terry's jersey was later retired in 2015.

Later years 
2001 was one of the most challenging and rewarding years for the program. Lute Olson's wife Bobbi, well known to players and fans alike as a steadfast presence on the sidelines, died of cancer. The team, which had been a preseason pick by many to win the national title had to play without Olson for three weeks while Olson was on bereavement leave. The Cats vowed to dedicate their season to Bobbi. With guard Jason Gardner, center Loren Woods and forward Michael Wright — each an All-American — leading the way, the Cats trounced their opponents, beating Oregon 104–65, devastating USC 105–61, and charging through the Final Four. They took down Eastern Illinois, Butler, Mississippi, Illinois, and Michigan State, only to be stopped by Duke in the title game. While being considered the favorite to win the title, which would have been Coach Olson's 2nd and tied him with Coach Mike Krzyzewski, his opponent, the Blue Devils claimed a ten-point victory in the game. This is the last game Coach Olson ever coached in the Final Four and is considered by fans of the program to be his most bitter defeat. A championship would have vaulted him into hallowed ground among coaches, being one of few with multiple titles. Instead he remains tied with many coaches who have a single championship ring to their name. Meanwhile, his opponent in that game now is in second place among college coaches with five championship rings, behind only John Wooden's ten. All five of Krzyzewski's titles came in the 64 team field era; Wooden none. Still Coach Olson earned the respect of his contemporary, Coach K said in the post-game interview that "Arizona had a great team and an amazing season and was worthy of winning the championship, let's give a hand to Coach Olson and his team." The comment drew rousing applause from the audience in attendance and made Coach Olson proud, even in defeat, to be honored as an equal by Coach Krzyzewski who many claim is the best coach in college history.

In his later years at U of A, Olson fielded competitive teams with extremely talented point guards. Continuing the reputation and nickname "Point Guard U," recent standouts include Jason Gardner, Salim Stoudamire, Mustafa Shakur, Jerryd Bayless and Nic Wise. Arizona would win Olson's last Pac-10 title during the 2004–2005 season under the spectacular play of seniors Salim Stoudamire and center Channing Frye. That team also made it to the Elite 8 and the verge of the Final Four before blowing a 15-point lead with four minutes to play and losing in overtime, 90–89, to the No. 1 seed and eventual national runner-up, University of Illinois.

Olson took an unexplained leave of absence at the beginning of the 2007–2008 season. Assistant coach Kevin O'Neill took over interim head coaching duties for the Arizona Wildcats. At that time, Olson announced that he intended to be back for the 2008–09 season and finish out his contract, which was scheduled to end in 2011. His departure was criticized by some members of the media. They also questioned how he and the U of A athletic department handled his return and the verbal succession agreement with coach O'Neill. However, on October 23, 2008, he unexpectedly announced his retirement from the program (by way of an announcement from Arizona athletic director Jim Livengood).  A few days later, Olson's personal physician held a press conference and explained that the retirement was strongly advised due to health concerns.

After Lute Olson's abrupt retirement, Arizona Athletic Director Jim Livengood appointed assistant coach Russ Pennell as the interim head coach for the 2008–2009 season 23 days before the start of the season.  The appointment came after Mike Dunlap, the associate head coach brought in to replace Kevin O'Neill, turned down the job. Under Pennell, the Cats finished 19–13 in the regular season, including a non-conference win over Kansas and a 7-game win streak with wins over UCLA and Washington. Despite a 19–13 finish to the season, Arizona was controversially selected as one of the last teams into the field of 65 as a 12th seed in the Midwest region, extending its NCAA consecutive tournament appearances to 25 years.  The Cats made it to the Sweet 16 (regional semi-finals) with wins over 5-seed Utah and 13-seed Cleveland State, before falling to overall 1-seed, Louisville.  Despite Pennell's post-season success, he was not retained, as Arizona announced before his hiring they would hold a national coaching search after the season ended. (On April 9, 2009, Pennell was hired as head coach of the men's basketball team at Division II Grand Canyon University, a member of the Pacific West Conference.)

Further NCAA sanctions under Olson 
Following Olson's retirement, reports of NCAA violations arose regarding payment of impermissible benefits to players and recruiting violations. In response, Arizona self-imposed sanctions that included a reduction in the number of recruiting visits by coaches and prospective players, the disbanding of a booster group, and implementation of a series of administrative and rules changes to prevent further violations. The NCAA upheld most of those self-imposed sanctions but determined the school had used two ineligible players in 2007-08 and would have to vacate all wins involving those players and eliminate their statistics. The NCAA reduced the number of scholarships and visits with recruits Arizona was allowed to make. The NCAA found that Olson failed to promote an atmosphere of compliance at the university but decided against sanctioning the coach because he was retired and had health issues. "I think that was my fault," Olson said during a 2008 interview with ESPN.com. "That wasn't anyone else's fault. It was my error and it was a big error. But I guess in 26 years you are allowed to make a mistake once in a while anyway and that's not to say I haven't made a lot of them but in terms of that, that was a big mistake on my part."

Sean Miller era 
After the end of the season, various coaching names were considered to succeed Lute Olson on a permanent basis. Arizona was perceived to have interest in Gonzaga's Mark Few, Pittsburgh's Jamie Dixon and then-Memphis coach John Calipari (before he accepted the vacant position at Kentucky) to take the job. Arizona even brought USC's Tim Floyd on campus for an interview and while Arizona claims no formal offer was ever presented, Floyd ultimately turned down the job publicly.

Arizona hired Sean Miller from Xavier University to fill the head coaching position. He initially turned the job down before changing his mind and accepting the job on Apr. 6, 2009 despite having never visited the Arizona campus. Miller was formally introduced as the 13th head men's basketball coach at Arizona at a press conference on April 7, 2009 at McKale Center.  At the press conference, Miller acknowledged Lute Olson's impact on the Arizona program by addressing Olson personally: "One of the reasons I sit here today is because of the great legacy you built." Miller also promised U of A fans that they would enjoy the style of both offense and defense he would bring to Wildcat basketball. Miller's salary is $1.6 million per year; he will receive an additional $400,000 per season from Nike and media contracts during a five-year deal, as well as a $1 million signing bonus and other amenities such as season tickets to other Wildcat sporting events and the use of a private jet. Within three months of joining the program, Miller compiled a strong five-player recruiting class that ranked 13th nationally in 2009. After going 16–15 and missing the NCAA tournament for the first time in 25 years during Miller's initial 2009–10 campaign.

In his second season as the head coach at Arizona, the Cats finished the season with 30–8, 14–4 Pac-12 play, behind the play of sophomore Pac-10 Player of the Year Derrick Williams.  It would be the Wildcats' first outright Pac-10 regular season title (its 12th overall), 4th 30+ win season (1st overall) and Elite Eight appearance (8th overall) since the 2004–2005 season. In addition, Miller led the Wildcats to their first unbeaten home record (17–0) in 14 years and was named Pac-10 Coach of the Year. This was the first time an Arizona coach received this honor since Lute Olson in 2003. The 17 wins without a loss at home is tied for the second-most in school history. Miller would add to the season's success by guiding the Cats to their first Elite Eight appearance since the 2004–2005 Season as a 5-seed. In the second round, Arizona secured a 2-point victory over 12th seeded Memphis (coached by former Wildcat (and member of the 1997 national title team) Josh Pastner) with a blocked shot in the final seconds by Derrick Williams. Arizona would follow with another close game—a controversial one-point win against 4-seed Texas. In the Sweet-16 match-up, Arizona found itself pitted against top-seeded Duke, the first time since the 2001 title game that the two schools had met. Duke would extend an early lead, but 25 points from Derrick Williams kept the Cats in the game and down by 6 points at the half. In the second half, Williams' teammates picked up the slack, dominating the Blue Devils by scoring 55 second-half points and routing the defending champs 93–77. Arizona's run at the Final Four would fall 2 points short, losing to 3-seed (and eventual national champion) Connecticut 65–63.

For his third season, Arizona's 2011 recruiting class was ranked 7th, notably signing Nick Johnson and Josiah Turner.  Arizona secured three players in the top nine of the ESPNU 100, with all four newly signed players within the top 36. This has cemented Arizona as the No. 1 signing class nationally, surpassing Kentucky who held the No. 1 spot 2010 and 2011. The Wildcats missed the postseason for the second time, reached to the NIT Tournament before falling to Bucknell to finish the season 23–12 overall, 12–6 in Pac-12.

In his fourth season, Miller guided to its second top-5 ranking in the AP poll (the first coming in weeks 7–10 of the 2012–2013 season), Arizona reached the Sweet 16 in 2013 falling to Ohio State, finished the season with 27–8, 12–6 in Pac-12.

In his fifth season with the most talent Coach Miller has had since arriving in Tucson. On December 9, 2013, Arizona became the #1 ranked Team in the Country for the 6th time in school history, after a 9–0 start with wins over traditional national powerhouses Duke and UNLV. The Wildcats followed this up by securing a key come-from-behind victory on the road at Michigan on December 14 and led the Wildcats to their second outright Pac-12 Regular Season Title (its 13th overall, 26th regular season overall) in Sean Miller's fifth year as the head coach. Arizona reached the second unbeaten home record at (18–0), Coach Miller again named the second Pac-10/12 coach of the year, 5th 30+ wins season (2nd overall), 2nd Elite Eight appearance (9th overall) in 2014. But in the 2014 NCAA tournament, the Wildcats would fall to Wisconsin in overtime, they finish the season with 33–5, 15–3 in Pac-12.

In his sixth season as the Arizona Wildcats basketball head coach, after Gonzaga's home loss to BYU on February 28, 2015, Arizona claimed the longest active home winning streak in D-I men's college basketball (38th home win at 2nd all-time, 82nd home win at 5th all-time). Arizona defeated #13 Utah in Salt Lake City the same day, winning its share of the Pac-12 regular season title. After three losses to Pac-12 archrival Arizona State, Oregon State and UNLV, Arizona won their third Pac-12 regular season championship title (2nd straight year, its 14th overall, 27th overall). Arizona reached the third unbeaten home record at (17–0). The Wildcats completes their sixth ever 30+ win (3rd overall) and won their first Pac-12 Tournament title (5th overall) since 2002. In the 2015 NCAA tournament, the Wildcats fell to the Wisconsin Badgers in Elite Eight, 85–78, and finished the season 34–4, 16–2 in the Pac-12.

In his seventh season, they finished the season 25–9, 12–6 in Pac-12 play to tie with California for third place. They defeated Colorado in the quarterfinals of the Pac-12 Tournament to advance to the semifinals where they lost to Oregon. In the 2016 NCAA Tournament, as a 6-seed in the South Region. They lost in the first round to Wichita State.

In his eighth season at U of A, AP polls & 81-straight coaches polls. The 97-consecutive weeks in the AP poll is currently the second-longest streak in the nation behind Kansas at 161 weeks.[1] They have been ranked every week in the 2016–2017 season, bringing those totals to 97 weeks for the AP & 100 weeks for the coaches poll. Arizona won its first 10 conference games, the best start since the '97-'98 season when they started 16–0. They finished the season at seventh ever 30+ wins with 32–5, tied at 16–2 with Oregon in Pac-12 play for first place to win their 3rd Pac-12 regular season championship title for the 15th time (28th overall). The Wildcats entered the Pac-12 Tournament as a 2-seed, the Wildcats defeated 7-seed Colorado in the quarterfinals, 3-seed UCLA in the semifinals and 1-seed Oregon in the championship game, Wildcats won their 2nd Pac-12 Tournament championship title for the 6th time. In the 2017 NCAA Tournament, as a 2-seed in the West regional, Arizona defeated the 15-seed North Dakota 100–82 in the first round, 7-seed Saint Mary's 69–60 in the second round and losing to Xavier 71–73 in the Sweet Sixteen.

Later seasons and NCAA investigations 
As Miller's ninth season as the head coach at Arizona was about to get underway, federal prosecutors announced, on September 26, 2017, bribery, soliciting a bribe and wire fraud charges against assistant coach Emanuel "Book" Richardson as part of a far-reaching, college basketball-wide scandal. Perhaps in part due to the ongoing scandal, the Wildcats ranked No. 2 in the country at one point, lost three games at the Battle 4 Atlantis tournament. Arizona would eventually fire Richardson for his role in the scandal and the team would recover to lead the Pac 12 for the majority of the season. On February 24, 2018, Associate Head Coach Lorenzo Romar was temporarily named head coach after news broke the previous day that Miller had been caught on an FBI wiretap offering to pay players to come to Arizona. On March 1, Miller held a joint press conference with the University denying all allegations and stating he would be retained as men's head basketball coach. That same night, the Wildcats won their 29th regular season conference title, 16th in the Pac-12, and secured the No. 1 seed in the conference tournament by defeating Stanford 75–67. On March 10, Arizona defeated USC to win a record seventh conference tournament title. As a result, the Wildcats received an automatic bid to their sixth straight NCAA tournament (35th NCAA tournament appearance, 12th all time) as the No. 4 seed in the South regional. The Wildcats, a trendy pick to make the Final Four and win the championship were blown out in the first round by No. 13 seed Buffalo, losing 89–68.

2018–2019 marked the tenth season for Sean Miller as the Arizona Wildcats head coach.  Arizona replaced all 5 starting players, 3 via the NBA draft.  After a victory against UTEP, Miller recorded his 250th win for Arizona (370th win overall), in only 324 games, which was the 5th fastest of any coach at any Division 1 program all-time. On January 5, 2019 Arizona won its 600th game in the McKale center with an 84–81 overtime victory over Utah.  Arizona became the first Pac-12 team to achieve 100 wins against conference opponents since the conference expanded to 12 teams before the 2011 season, after defeating Stanford 75−70 Jan. 9, 2019.  The Wildcats would go on to finish the season in Pac-12 play 8–10, 9th place overall & lose their first round Pac-12 Tournament match up against USC, 65−78.  They would end the season with an overall record of 17–15 & decline an invitation to the CBI.

2019–2020 marked the eleventh season for Sean Miller as the Arizona Wildcats head coach.  Despite again losing all 5 starting players, Arizona would bring in the 6th overall best recruiting class & ranked pre-season 21st by the AP Poll.  Arizona would open the season 9–0, capped off by winning the Wooden Legacy tournament located in Anaheim, California led by tournament MVP Nico Mannion & defeated Wake Forest 73–66.  Arizona finished non-conference play ranked 16th with an overall record of 10–3.  On February 1, 2020, Miller would win his 400th overall game of his career in a 75−70 over USC to move their record to 16–6 & 6–3 in conference play.  They would defeat Stanford in Maples Pavilion for the conferences longest active streak 20th time, 69–60.  Arizona would finish the regular season with an overall record of 20–11 & 10–8 in conference play, which was good for 5th.  The Wildcats would face 12 seed Washington in their first-round match up & win 77–70, to set up a second-round matchup versus 4 seed USC.  The season would end due to the COVID-19 Pandemic which shut down sports globally & end the 2019–20 season.  Arizona would have an overall record 21–11 & were a projected 7 seed but could have moved higher pending the remainder of the Pac-12 tournament.

In 2020–21, Arizona would begin its twelfth season under Head Coach Sean Miller.  The Pac-12 announced before the season started that schools would not allow for fans to be in attendance due to the COVID-19 pandemic.   Also due to travel restrictions, financial impact & COVID-19 testing, Arizona was forced to cancel non-conference match ups against pre-season top 5 teams, Gonzaga & Illinois, as well as cancel their appearance in the 2020 NIT Season Tip-Off in Brooklyn against top 15 ranked Texas Tech, Cincinnati & St. John's.  In total Arizona would have 14 games cancelled, postponed or rescheduled but none of which were due to COVID-19 issues within the Arizona Wildcat program.

This season also marked the introduction of expanded Pac-12 play with each team adding two games, one home & one road, during the months of November & December for a total of 20 with the Wildcats adding games at home against Colorado & on the road against Stanford.  Arizona again would replace the entire starting 5 for a third straight season but bring in another top 10 recruiting class, 7th overall led by six international players from Canada, Estonia, France, Lithuania & Turkey, as well as the United States.  Arizona would finish non-conference play with an overall record of 6–0 against its opponents.  Arizona would lose its opening Pac-12 game against Stanford 75–78 which would snap the Wildcats' 20-game winning streak against the Cardinal.

Following 88–74 victory over Colorado, the Wildcats' announced a Self-Imposed one-year postseason ban, which included the 2021 Pac-12 tournament.

On February 20, Sean Miller would win his 300th game at Arizona in only his 408th, 3rd fastest for any coach at any Pac-12 school by defeating the #17 USC Trojans by a score of 81–72.  During the halftime of match up against Washington, Arizona would induct former players Ernie McCray (1958–60) & Al Fleming (1972-76) as the 26th & 27th members of the program's Ring of Honor.  Arizona would end the season with an overall record of 17–9 overall and finish 5th in the conference at 11–9 but because of their self-imposed ban would not participate in the conference tournament.  Many bracketologists stated that Arizona would have been an NCAA tournament team if not for the self-imposed ban.

In March 2021, a Notice of Allegations from the NCAA, originally issued in October 2020 at the conclusion of the NCAA's initial investigation, was released to the media by the University after a lawsuit was filed by ESPN; the school received five Level I violations, considered the NCAA's most serious, one specifically against Miller for failing to monitor his assistant coaches accused of academic misconduct and other rules violations.  None of the allegations included anything regarding former player Deandre Ayton.

On April 7, 2021, Arizona fired Sean Miller after 12 years.  Miller at the time had  finished his coaching career with an overall record of 302–109, five regular–season Pac-12 championships, three conference tournament titles & seven NCAA appearances.  His 302 wins were the 3rd most in school history.  The NCAA along with the IARP would vacate 32 wins from the 2016–17 season and 18 wins from the 2017–18 season, for a total of 50 wins.  It would bring his all time record to 252–109 and his 252 wins would remain the 3rd most in school history.

Tommy Lloyd era 
After the University decided to part ways with Sean Miller, various coaching names were considered to succeed him on a permanent basis. Three former Wildcats who played under Lute Olson - Damon Stoudamire (head coach at the University of the Pacific), Miles Simon (assistant for the Los Angeles Lakers), and Josh Pastner (head coach at Georgia Tech), as well as Arkansas' Eric Musselman, were under speculation to take the job. On April 14, 2021, it was announced that Tommy Lloyd, the longtime top assistant coach at Gonzaga under Mark Few, would become the 18th head coach of Arizona men's basketball. Both Lloyd and Few have been heavily influenced by the European style of basketball (and a focus on recruiting international players), as well as the uptempo, player-focused offense as implemented at Arizona under Lute Olson. A formal press conference was held at McKale Center on April 15 to introduce Lloyd as the head coach.  Coach Lloyd got his first victory as a head coach versus the Wildcats' in-state rival Northern Arizona 81–52. His 29-point victory versus NAU was the second largest margin in a coach's debut in school history & largest since 1915.  He would win his first Pac-12 game on December 12, 2021 against Oregon State, 90–65.  Coach Lloyd & Arizona would go on to lose their first game of his career & season in Knoxville, 73–77 against no. 19 Tennessee.

The Wildcats would finish the regular season undefeated on their home court at McKale Center for the 2021-22 campaign, one of only five programs in the nation to do so. The Wildcats would be led by sophomore guards Bennedict Mathurin, Kerr Kriisa and Dalen Terry, as well as junior center Christian Koloko and sophomore forward Ąžuolas Tubelis.  Coach Lloyd & the Wildcats would win their 1st regular season conference title under Lloyd & 17th overall as a program with a 91–71 road win over USC.  In the season finale Arizona would defeat California 89–61, becoming the first program & coach to win 18 conference games in the Pac-12 in one season.  Arizona clinched the top seed in the 2022 Pac-12 tournament; they would go on to defeat No. 9 seed Stanford 84–80, No. 4 seed Colorado 82–72 & No. 2 seed (No. 16 in the AP poll) UCLA 84–76 to win their 8th overall conference tournament title & Coach Tommy Lloyd's 1st.  Following the end of the Pac-12 season Lloyd was named Pac-12 Coach of the Year.  Arizona finished the Pac-12 portion of the season with a 31–3 record, earning a number 2 ranking in both the AP & coaches poll.  Following the Pac-12 tournament title win, Arizona was selected as the second overall number 1 seed in the South Regional of the 2022 March Madness Tournament where they would go on to play 16 seed Wright State in their first round matchup. Arizona reached its 20th "Sweet 16" by defeating TCU in overtime 85–80. The Wildcats' season would end with a Sweet 16 loss to Houston 72-60. Lloyd was named as a finalists for the Naismith Award.  Following the end of the season Coach Lloyd won the AP Coach of the Year, NABC Coach of the Year & USBWA Coach of the Year.

Arizona would begin the 2022–23 Season by winning the 2022 Maui Invitational Tournament by defeating Cincinnati, No. 17 San Diego State, No. 10 Creighton as well as non-conference games against No. 14 Indiana in the Las Vegas Clash & No. 6 Tennessee in McKale.

Season by season results

Under Tommy Lloyd

Rivalries

Arizona State

Since Arizona State became a University on December 5, 1958, Arizona leads ASU 77–59. Since both schools joined the Pac-10 conference in the 1978–79 season Arizona leads ASU 64–29. Since Lute Olson took over as head coach for the 1983–84 season Arizona leads ASU 63–17.  Sean Miller took over for the 2009–2010 season Arizona & finished with a 17–7 record against ASU.

The most recent matchup came in Las Vegas, NV on March 10, 2023, with Arizona winning 78–59. Arizona lead the all-time series with 159–87.

UCLA

Since then, the two schools competed for the Pac-10 (now Pac-12) Championship every year, with the two teams winning 23 out of the 31 conference titles, and 9 of 18 conference tournament titles. Arizona clinched their first conference title in 1986, when they won on the road at UCLA in Olson's third season. The UCLA-Arizona basketball rivalry is still seen as the match up of the two premier teams in the conference. Also, the performance of the two schools influences the national opinion of the conference. California Coach Mike Montgomery has stated, "...If those two are not good, the conference is not perceived as being good. People don't give credit to the schools across the board in the league." Since the mid-1980s, Arizona has also had a basketball rivalry with UCLA, as the two schools competed for the Pac-10 Championship every year. Since 1985 the two teams have combined to win 25 out of the 35 conference titles. The UCLA-Arizona basketball rivalry still is seen as the match up of the two premier teams in the conference. Also, the performance of the two schools influences the national opinion of the conference.

The most recent matchup came March 11, 2023, where Arizona beat UCLA 61–59. Arizona Wildcats trailed the all-time series lead by UCLA with 63–48.

Traditional rivalries

Other rivals
Arizona has in-state rivalries with NAU & Grand Canyon.  They also has historic rivalries with Kansas, Duke, San Diego State and Gonzaga.

Notable players and coaches

The Wildcats have had 18 coaches in their 116-year history. To date, one Wildcats’ coach has won the National Coach-of-the-Year award: Lute Olson twice, in 1988 and 1990. Additionally, 3 Wildcats coaches have been named Pac-12 Conference Coach-of-the-Year: Lute Olson in 1986, 1988, 1989, 1993, 1994, 1998 and 2003, Sean Miller in 2011, 2014, and 2017, and Tommy Lloyd in 2022.

Wildcats inducted into the Naismith Memorial Basketball Hall of Fame 

Coaches
 Lute Olson (2002)

Wildcats in the Olympics
The following Arizona Wildcats men's basketball players have represented their country in basketball in the Summer Olympics:

Current players in the NBA/NBA G-League

Source: Arizona 2022-23 Media Guide

Current players in international leagues
 Brandon Ashley − Altiri Chiba (Japan)
 Parker Jackson-Cartwright − Beşiktaş (Turkey)
 Daniel Dillon – Free Agent
 Kyle Fogg – Liaoning Flying Leopards (China)
 Rondae Hollis-Jefferson – TNT Tropang Giga (Philippines)
 Grant Jerrett – Utsunomiya Brex (Japan)
 Nick Johnson – Beijing Ducks (China)
 Ira Lee – ALM Évreux Basket (France)
 Ryan Luther – UCAM Murcia CB (Spain)
 Nico Mannion – Virtus Bologna (Italy)
 Kyrylo Natyazhko – BC Dnipro (Ukraine)
 Keanu Pinder – Baloncesto Fuenlabrada (Spain)
 Dušan Ristić – Galatasaray S.K. (Turkey) 
 Dylan Smith – Ostioneros de Guaymas (Mexico)
 Allonzo Trier – Free Agent
 Kaleb Tarczewski – Gunma Crane Thunders (Japan)
 Derrick Williams – Panathinaikos B.C. (Greece)

NBA/NBA G League coaches and executives
Steve Kerr, head coach, Golden State Warriors
Joseph Blair, assistant coach, Washington Wizards
Bret Brielmaier, assistant coach, Orlando Magic
Quinton Crawford, assistant coach, Dallas Mavericks
Bruce Fraser, assistant coach, Golden State Warriors
Jesse Mermuys, assistant coach, Orlando Magic
Miles Simon, head coach, South Bay Lakers
Ray Smith, basketball operations intern, Utah Jazz
Jason Terry, assistant coach, Utah Jazz
Luke Walton, assistant coach, Cleveland Cavaliers

NCAA
Damon Stoudamire, Head Coach, Georgia Tech

NBA draft history

13 different NBA championships have been won by 13 Wildcats players. Since the NBA draft was shortened to two rounds in 1989, 46 Arizona players have been selected. Former Wildcats have had successful NBA careers, totaling over $1.6 billion in total contracts through the 2022–2023 NBA season

Source: Arizona 2022–23 Media Guide 
)

Wildcats with NBA championships
A total of 31 NBA championships have been won by 13 former Wildcats, consisting of 14 different finals years (1996, 1997, 1998, 1999, 2003, 2009, 2010, 2011, 2015, 2016, 2017, 2018, 2020 and 2022). 6 of the last 8 championship teams have had a former Wildcat as a player and/or coaching staff member on the team.

Former Wildcats have played in 20 of the last 27 finals and have coached in 7 of the last 8 finals.

Honors, awards, and accomplishments

The individual honors, awards, and accomplishments listed in the succeeding subsections are aggregated by player in the following table. Players with only all-conference honors (other than conference player of the year), lower than first-team All-America honors, or later than second-round draft positions are not included.

Source: Arizona 2022-23 Media Guide

National honors and awards (players)

John R. Wooden Award 
 1989 – Sean Elliott

National Player of the Year 
 1989 – Sean Elliott
 1997 – Mike Bibby
 1999 – Jason Terry

Wayman Tisdale Award

 2000 – Jason Gardner

NCAA Final Four Most Outstanding Player 
 1997– Miles Simon

Frank Hessler Award 
 2000 – Loren Woods

Julius Erving Award
 2015 – Stanley Johnson

Karl Malone Award
 2018 — Deandre Ayton

Conference honors and awards (players)

Pac-12 Player of the Year 
 1988 – Sean Elliott
 1989 – Sean Elliott
 1993 – Chris Mills
 1995 – Damon Stoudamire
 1998 – Mike Bibby
 1999 – Jason Terry
 2011 – Derrick Williams
 2014 – Nick Johnson
 2018 – Deandre Ayton
 2022 – Bennedict Mathurin

Pac-12 Freshman of the Year 
 1986 – Sean Elliott
 1997 – Mike Bibby
 1999 – Michael Wright
 2002 – Salim Stoudamire
 2007 – Chase Budinger
 2010 – Derrick Williams
 2014 – Aaron Gordon
 2015 – Stanley Johnson
 2018 – Deandre Ayton
 2020 – Zeke Nnaji

Pac-12 Defensive Player of the Year
 2022 – Christian Koloko

Pac-12 Most Improved Player of The Year
 2022 – Christian Koloko
 2023 – Oumar Ballo

Pac-12 6th Man of the Year
 2021 – Jordan Brown
 2022 – Pelle Larsson

Pac-12 Scholar Athlete of the Year 
 2020: Stone Gettings

Pac-12 Tournament MVP's
 1988: Sean Elliott
 1989: Sean Elliott 
 1990: Jud Buechler/Matt Muehlebach
 2002: Luke Walton
 2005: Salim Stoudamire
 2015: Brandon Ashley
 2017: Allonzo Trier
 2018: Deandre Ayton
 2022: Bennedict Mathurin
 2023: Ąžuolas Tubelis

All-Americans

Consensus first team

Arizona has had 31 All-American All-Americans selections.  They have had 7 players selected as Consensus First Team All-Americans 8 times.

 1951 – Roger Johnson (3rd, Helms Foundation)
 1976 – Bob Elliott (3rd, Basketball Weekly; Helms Foundation/Citizen’s Savings)
 1977 – Bob Elliott (2) (1st-Team, Helms Foundation/Citizen's Savings)
 1988 – Sean Elliott (Consensus 1st-Team)
 1988 – Steve Kerr (2nd, AP; 3rd, NABC)
 1989 – Sean Elliott (2) (Consensus 1st-Team)
 1993 – Chris Mills (2nd, Basketball Weekly; 3rd, Basketball Times, NABC, AP, UPI)
 1994 –  Khalid Reeves (Consensus 2nd-Team)
 1995 – Damon Stoudamire (Consensus 1st-Team)
 1998 – Mike Bibby (Consensus 1st-Team) 
 1998 – Miles Simon (Consensus 1st-Team)

 1998 – Michael Dickerson (3rd, AP)
 1999 – Jason Terry (Consensus 1st-Team)
 2000 – Jason Gardner (3rd, Basketball Times)
 2001 – Michael Wright (3rd, AP, ESPN)
 2001 – Gilbert Arenas (3rd, ESPN; HM AP)
 2002 – Jason Gardner (2nd, Basketball America; 3rd, AP, NABC)
 2002 – Luke Walton (1st, John Wooden; 2nd, SN, BN; 3rd, BT)
 2003 – Jason Gardner (Consensus 2nd-Team)
 2005 – Channing Frye (2nd, Basketball Times)
 2005 – Salim Stoudamire (Consensus 2nd-Team)

 2008 – Jerryd Bayless (2nd, SI, ESPN)
 2009 – Jordan Hill (3rd, SN; HM AP)
 2011 – Derrick Williams (Consensus 2nd-Team)
 2014 – Nick Johnson (Consensus 1st-Team) 
 2014 – Aaron Gordon (3rd, Sporting News)
 2015 – Stanley Johnson (3rd, NABC)
 2017 – Lauri Markkanen (3rd, NABC, AP, SN, USAT)
 2018 – Deandre Ayton (Consensus 1st-Team) 
 2022 – Bennedict Mathurin (Consensus 2nd-Team) 
 2023 – Ąžuolas Tubelis (Consensus 2nd-Team)

Fourteen Arizona players have received AP All-America honorable mention:

 1991 – Chris Mills (AP Honorable Mention)
 1991 – Brian Williams (AP Honorable Mention)
 1992 – Chris Mills (2) (AP Honorable Mention)
 1992 – Sean Rooks (AP Honorable Mention)
 1994 – Damon Stoudamire (AP Honorable Mention, Basketball Weekly, USBWA)
 1997 – Michael Dickerson (AP Honorable Mention)
 2000 – Loren Woods (AP Honorable Mention)

 2000 – Michael Wright (AP Honorable Mention)
 2001 – Jason Gardner (AP Honorable Mention)
 2001 – Loren Woods (2) (AP Honorable Mention)
 2003 – Luke Walton (AP Honorable Mention)
 2004 – Andre Iguodala (AP Honorable Mention)
 2009 – Chase Budinger (AP Honorable Mention)
 2018 – Allonzo Trier (AP Honorable Mention)

McDonald's All-Americans

The following 27 McDonald's All-Americans listed below have signed with Arizona. An asterisk, "*", Indicates player did not finish his college career at Arizona. A cross, "†", indicates player did not begin his college career at Arizona.

 
1970–1999
 1984 – Craig McMillan
 1985 – Sean Elliott
 1987 – Brian Williams
 1988 – Chris Mills†
 1990 – Khalid Reeves
 1991 – Ben Davis†
 1996 – Mike Bibby
 1996 – Loren Woods†
 1998 – Richard Jefferson
 1999 – Jason Gardner

2000–2019
 2002 – Hassan Adams
 2003 – Mustafa Shakur
 2004 – Jawann McClellan
 2006 – Chase Budinger
 2007 – Jerryd Bayless
 2012 – Brandon Ashley & Grant Jerrett
 2013 – Rondae Hollis-Jefferson & Aaron Gordon
 2014 – Stanley Johnson
 2015 – Chase Jeter† & Allonzo Trier
 2016 – Kobi Simmons 
 2017 – Deandre Ayton
 2018 – Jordan Brown†
 2019 – Josh Green & Nico Mannion 

2020–present

All-Pac-12 honors
The following is a list of Arizona Wildcats men's basketball players that were named first, second or third team All-Pac-12:

First team All-Pac-12

 1979 – Larry Demic
 1980 – Joe Dehls (2)
 1981 – Ron Davis
 1984 – Pete Williams
 1985 – Pete Williams
 1985 – Eddie Smith
 1986 – Steve Kerr
 1987 – Sean Elliott
 1988 – Sean Elliott (2)‡
 1988 – Steve Kerr (2)
 1988 – Anthony Cook
 1989 – Sean Elliott (3)‡
 1989 – Anthony Cook (2)
 1990 – Jud Buechler
 1991 – Brian Williams
 1992 – Chris Mills
 1992 – Sean Rooks

 1992 – Damon Stoudamire
 1993 – Chris Mills (2)‡
 1994 – Khalid Reeves
 1994 – Damon Stoudamire (2)
 1995 – Ray Owes
 1995 – Damon Stoudamire (3)‡
 1996 – Ben Davis
 1996 - Reggie Geary 
 1997 – Michael Dickerson
 1998 – Mike Bibby‡
 1998 – Michael Dickerson (2)
 1998 – Miles Simon
 1999 – A.J. Bramlett
 1999 – Jason Terry‡
 2000 – Jason Gardner
 2000 – Michael Wright
 2000 – Loren Woods

 2001 – Gilbert Arenas
 2001 – Michael Wright (2)
 2002 – Jason Gardner (2)
 2002 – Luke Walton
 2003 – Jason Gardner (3)
 2003 – Luke Walton (2)
 2004 – Channing Frye
 2004 – Andre Iguodala
 2005 – Channing Frye (2)
 2005 – Salim Stoudamire
 2006 – Hassan Adams
 2007 – Marcus Williams
 2009 – Jordan Hill
 2010 – Derrick Williams†
 2011 – Derrick Williams (2)‡
 2012 – Kyle Fogg
 2012 – Solomon Hill

 2013 – Solomon Hill (2)
 2014 – Aaron Gordon
 2014 – Nick Johnson‡
 2015 – Rondae Hollis-Jefferson
 2015 – Stanley Johnson
 2015 – T. J. McConnell
 2016 – Ryan Anderson
 2017 – Lauri Markkanen
 2018 – Deandre Ayton‡†
 2018 – Allonzo Trier
 2020 – Zeke Nnaji†
 2021 – James Akinjo
 2022 – Christian Koloko∞
 2022 – Bennedict Mathurin‡
 2022 – Ąžuolas Tubelis
 2023 – Oumar Ballo
 2023 – Ąžuolas Tubelis

Note
‡ indicates player was Pac-12 Player of the Year
† indicates player was Pac-12 Freshman of the Year
∞ indicates player was Pac-12 Defensive Player of the Year

Second team All-Pac-12

Second team was only awarded from the '77–79' & starting again in the 2007 season.

 1979 – Joe Dehls
 2008 – Jerryd Bayless
 2009 – Nic Wise
 2014 – T. J. McConnell
 2016 – Kaleb Tarczewski
 2016 – Gabe York
 2017 – Allonzo Trier
 2017 – Kadeem Allen
 2018 – Dusan Ristic
 2020 – Nico Mannion

Third team All-Pac-12

Pac-12 3rd team was only given during the 2007–2008 season.

 2008 – Chase Budinger

Pac-12 All Freshman Team

 1982 – Brock Brunkhorst
 1984 – Michael Tait
 1986 – Sean Elliott ‡
 1989 – Sean Rooks
 1989 – Matt Othick
 1990 – Ed Stokes
 1991 – Khalid Reeves
 1992 – Damon Stoudamire
 1997 – Mike Bibby ‡
 1999 – Richard Jefferson
 1999 – Michael Wright ‡
 2000 – Gilbert Arenas

 2000 – Jason Gardner
 2002 – Channing Frye
 2002 – Salim Stoudamire ‡
 2003 – Hassan Adams
 2003 – Andre Iguodala
 2004 – Mustafa Shakur
 2006 – Marcus Williams
 2007 – Chase Budinger ‡
 2008 – Jerryd Bayless
 2010 – Derrick Williams ‡
 2012 – Nick Johnson
 2014 – Aaron Gordon ‡

 2014 – Rondae Hollis-Jefferson
 2015 – Stanley Johnson ‡
 2016 – Allonzo Trier
 2017 – Lauri Markkanen
 2017 – Rawle Alkins
 2018 – Deandre Ayton ‡
 2020 – Nico Mannion
 2020 – Zeke Nnaji ‡

Note
‡ indicates player was Pac-12 Freshman of the Year.

Pac-12 All Newcomer

 1995 – Ben Davis Jr.
 1997 – Bennett Davison Jr.
 2000 – Loren Woods‡

Note
‡ indicates player was Pac-12 Newcomer of the Year

Pac-12 All-Defensive Team

 2009 – Jordan Hill
 2012 – Kyle Fogg
 2014 – Nick Johnson
 2014 – T. J. McConnell
 2015 – Rondae Hollis-Jefferson
 2015 – T. J. McConnell
 2016 – Kaleb Tarczewski
 2017 – Kadeem Allen
 2018 – Deandre Ayton
 2022 – Dalen Terry
 2022 – Christian Koloko‡

Note
‡ indicates player was Pac-12 Defensive Player of the Year

Pac-12 All-Academic Team

 1986 – Steve Kerr
 1988 – Steve Kerr (2)
 1989 – Matt Muehlebach
 1990 – Matt Muehlebach (2)
 1991 – Matt Muehlebach (3)
 1994 – Kevin Flanagan
 2001 – Eugene Edgerson
 2004 – Jason Ranne‡
 2004 – Andre Iguodala^
 2004 – Brett Brielmaier‡
 2019 – Chase Jeter‡
 2020 – Stone Gettings‡
 2022 - Jordan Mains

Notes
‡ indicates player was Pac-12 First Team Selection
^ indicates player was Pac-12 Second Team

All-Pac 12 Tournament Team

1988 - Sean Rooks
1988 - Steve Kerr
1988 - Anthony Cook
1989 - Sean Rooks (2)
1989 - Jud Buechler
1989 - Anthony Cook
1990 - Jud Buechler (2)

1990 - Matt Muehlebach
2002 - Luke Walton
2004 - Hassan Adams 
2005 - Salim Stoudamire
2005 - Channing Frye
2011 - Derrick Williams
2012 - Kyle Fogg

2012 - Solomon Hill
2012 - Jesse Perry
2014 - Aaron Gordon
2014 - Nick Johnson
2015 - Brandon Ashley
2015 - Rondae Hollis-Jefferson
2015 - Stanley Johnson

2015 - T. J. McConnell
2017 - Allonzo Trier
2017 - Lauri Markkanen
2018 - Deandre Ayton
2018 - Dusan Ristic
2022 - Bennedict Mathurin
2022 - Christian Koloko 

Pac-12 Players of the Week

54 Pac-12 Players of the Week Totaling 109 Selections

 Chris Mills (7)
 Sean Elliott (6)
 Salim Stoudamire (5)
 Jason Terry (4)
 Hassan Adams (3)
 Michael Dickerson (3)
 Jason Gardner (3)
 Steve Kerr (3)
 Bennedict Mathurin (3)
 Khalid Reeves (3)
 Miles Simon (3)
 Ąžuolas Tubelis (3)
 Derrick Williams (3)
 Loren Woods (3)
 Gilbert Arenas (2)

 Deandre Ayton (2)
 Chase Budinger (2)
 Jud Buechler (2)
 Anthony Cook (2)
 Kyle Fogg (2)
 Jordan Hill (2)
 Solomon Hill (2)
 Stanley Johnson (2)
 Lauri Markkanen (2)
 Ivan Radenovic (2)
 Damon Stoudamire (2)
 Allonzo Trier (2)
 Luke Walton (2)
 Pete Williams (2)
 Nic Wise (2)

 Michael Wright (2)
 Ryan Anderson
 Jemarl Baker Jr.
 Oumar Ballo
 Jerryd Bayless
 Mike Bibby
 Joseph Blair
 Ben Davis
 Robbie Dosty
 Channing Frye
 Rondae Hollis-Jefferson
 Nick Johnson
 Lamont Jones
 Jamelle Horne
 Christian Koloko

 Mark Lyons
 Craig McMillan
 Matt Muehlebach
 Joe Nehls
 Dusan Ristic
 Eddie Smith
 Ed Stokes
 Brian Williams
 Gabe York

Notes
 Number of selections in parentheses

Pac-12 Freshman of the Week

5 Pac-12 Freshman of the Week Totaling 8 Selections
 Zeke Nnaji (4)
 Ąžuolas Tubelis (2)
 Kylan Boswell
 Nico Mannion
 Bennedict Mathurin

Notes
 Pac–12 began selecting Freshman of the Week starting in the 2019–20 season

Wildcats in the Naismith Memorial Basketball Hall of Fame

Players
 Sean Elliott (2018)

Coaches
 Lute Olson (2002, 2006)

Coaching honors and awards (coaches)

National Coach of the Year
 Lute Olson – 1988, 1990

AP Coach of the Year
 Tommy Lloyd – 2022 (AP)

NABC Coach of the Year
 Tommy Lloyd – 2022 (NABC)

USBWA Coach of the Year
 Tommy Lloyd – 2022 (USBWA)

WAC Coach of the Year
 Fred Snowden – 1972

John R. Wooden Legends of Coaching Award
 Lute Olson – 2002

Clair Bee Coach of the Year Award
 Lute Olson – 2001

Pac-12 Coach of the Year
 Lute Olson – 1986, 1988, 1989, 1993, 1994, 1998, 2003
 Sean Miller – 2011, 2014, 2017 
 Tommy Lloyd – 2022

Arizona's Ring of Honor

A total of 32 Wildcats have earned entry into McKale Center's Ring of Honor, the display of names that begins in the southeast corner of the building's rafters. In order to join this elite group, players must meet at least one of the following six criteria:
1.) First-team All-America recognition by one or more of the major national organizations
or media;
2.) Major national “player of distinction,” i.e. the Wooden Award or other honor of
significance;
3.) Pac-12 Player of the Year or Pac-12 Freshman of the Year;
4.) Arizona career leader in three or more major positive career categories at the conclusion
of his collegiate career and must hold the career record for a minimum of five years
(excluding single-game records);
5.) Ten or more years of experience in the NBA or selection as an All-Star or an All-Pro;
6.) Olympic medalist

Players:

 Ernie McCray, F (1957–60)
 Al Fleming, F (1972–76)
 Bob Elliott, C (1974–77)
 Steve Kerr, G (1984–88)
 Sean Elliott, G/F (1986–89)
 Jud Buechler, F (1987–90)
 Sean Rooks, C (1989–92)
 Chris Mills, G/F (1991–93)
 Khalid Reeves, G (1991–94)
 Damon Stoudamire, G (1992–95)
 Miles Simon, G (1995–98)

 Jason Terry, G (1996–99)
 Mike Bibby, G (1996–98)
 Michael Wright, F (1999–01)
 Richard Jefferson, F (1999–01)
 Jason Gardner, G (1999–03)
 Luke Walton, F (2000–03)
 Salim Stoudamire, G (2002–05)
 Gilbert Arenas, G (2000–01)
 Channing Frye, C (2002–05)
 Chase Budinger, F (2007–09)
 Derrick Williams, F (2010–11)

 Andre Iguodala, F (2003–04)
 Aaron Gordon, F (2014)
 Nick Johnson, G (2012–14)
 Stanley Johnson, G (2015)
 Jerryd Bayless, G (2008)
 Deandre Ayton, F (2018)
 Zeke Nnaji, F (2020)
 Josh Green, G (2020)
 Bennedict Mathurin, G (2020–22)
 Lauri Markkanen, F (2016–17)

Retired numbers

Championships 

Though the automatic berth in the NCAA tournament is given to the conference tournament winner, the Pac–12 declares the team with the best record in the regular season the "official" conference champion.

National championships

Conference championships

Invitational tournament championships

 The NCAA vacated 32 wins from the 2016–17 season, and 18 wins from the 2017–18 season as a result of the 2017–18 NCAA men's basketball corruption scandal.  The players involved in the scandal played in every game in the 2016–17 & 23 games in the 2017–18 season, resulting in a 9–8 record.

Pac-12 tournament championships

U of A has won the Pac-10/12 Tournament a record nine times (two appearances in 2017 and 2018 were later vacated by the NCAA, 7 total), including three straight times from 1988 to 1990.
Source: 2022-23 Arizona Wildcats Media Guide

* Arizona vacated all tournament wins and 2017, 2018 titles due to NCAA penalty.

Postseason results

NCAA tournament
Arizona has appeared 37* NCAA Division I men's basketball tournaments (33), and 4 National Invitation Tournaments (NIT).

The Wildcats have a record is 58–35. However, their appearances in 1999, 2008, 2017 and 2018 have been vacated by the NCAA making their official record 45–18. They were NCAA National Champions in 1997, is the only team to date to beat three #1 seeds to win the national championship. 

Arizona is second #No.2 seed to ever lose a first-round game, losing 64–61 to #15 seed Santa Clara, led by future NBA star Steve Nash in 1993. Thirty years later in 2023, the Wildcats losing 59-55 to #15 seed Princeton.

National championship results

Final Fours results
The Arizona Wildcats have been to four Final Fours, which is tied for 21st all time among Division I schools. 

NCAA Tournament Seeding History

The NCAA began seeding the NCAA Division I men's basketball tournament with the 1979 edition. The 64-team field started in 1985, which guaranteed that a championship team had to win six games.

NCAA Tournament round history

NIT results 
The Arizona Wildcats have appeared in the four National Invitation Tournaments (NIT). Arizona's combined record is 0–4.

Arizona basketball cumulative all-time statistics 

Arizona can also lay claim to several individual achievements for both players and coaches:
 9 players winning NBA Championships a total of 18 times
 4 players named NBA All-Star a total of 7 times
 2 Olympic Gold Medal & 2 Bronze Medal winners
 4 players named National Player-of-the-Year
 1 head coach named National Coach-of-the Year a total of 2 times
 3 head coaches named Pac-12 Coach-of-the-Year a total of 11 times
 9 players named Conference Player-of-the-Year a total of 10 times
 10 players named Conference Freshman-of-the-Year
 2 players named Conference 6th-Man-of-the-Year
 1 player named Conference Defensive-Player-of-the-Year
 2 player named Conference Most-Improved-Player-of-the-Year
 10 players named Conference tournament MVP a total of 11 times
 1 players named NCAA Final Four Most Outstanding Player a total of 1 time
 4 players named NCAA Regional Most Outstanding Player a total of 4 times
 29 players named McDonald's All-American
 2 players named McDonald's All-American MVP

All-time statistical leaders

School records

Individual career

 Points: Sean Elliott, 2,555
 Scoring Average: Coniel Norman, 23.9 ppg
 Field Goals: Sean Elliott, 892
 Field Goal Attempts: Sean Elliott, 1,750
 Field Goal Percentage: Joseph Blair, .613
 3-Point Field Goals: Salim Stoudamire ‡, 342
 3-Point Field Goal Attempts: Jason Gardner, 875
 3-Point Field Goal Percentage: Steve Kerr, .573
 Free Throws: Sean Elliott, 623
 Free Throw Attempts: Sean Elliott, 786
 Free Throw Percentage: Dylan Rigdon, .872
 Rebounds: Al Fleming, 1,190
 Rebound Average: Joe Skaisgir, 11.2 rpg
 Assists: Russell Brown, 810
 Steals: Jason Terry, 245
 Blocked Shots: Anthony Cook, 278
 Games Played: Dusan Ristic, 141
 Games Started: Jason Gardner, 135
 Minutes Played: Jason Gardner, 4,825
 Average Minutes Per Game: Jason Gardner, 35.5 mpg
 Most Wins in a Career: Dušan Ristić 115 Wins

Note
‡ indicates player was also Conference record holder

Team season records

 Points: Khalid Reeves, 848 (1993-94')
 Scoring Average: Khalid Reeves, 24.2 ppg (1993-94')
 Field Goals: Khalid Reeves & Deandre Ayton, 276 (1993-94')(2017-18')
 Field Goal Attempts: Khalid Reeves, 572 (1993-94')
 Field Goal Percentage: Al Fleming, .667 (1973-74')
 3-Point Field Goals: Salim Stoudamire ‡, 120 (2004-05')
 3-Point Field Goal Attempts: Jason Gardner, 276 (2001-02')
 3-Point Field Goal Percentage: Steve Kerr ‡, .573 (1987-88')
 Free Throws: Derrick Williams, 247 (2010-11')
 Free Throw Attempts: Derrick Williams ‡, 331 (2010-11')
 Free Throw Percentage: Salim Stoudamire, .910 (2004–05)
 Rebounds: Deandre Ayton, 405 (2017-18')
 Rebound Average: Bill Reeves, 13.2 rpg (1955-56')
 Assists: Russell Brown, 247 (1978-79')
 Steals: Mike Bibby, 87 (1997-98')
 Blocked Shots: Loren Woods, 102 (1999-00')
 Games Played: 28 Players, 38 Games
 Games Started: 12 Players, 38 Games
 Minutes Played: Chase Budinger, 1,317 (2008-09')
 Average Minutes Per Game: Steve Kerr, 38.4 mpg (1985-86')

Note
‡ indicates player was also Conference record holder

Freshman single season leaders

 Points: Deandre Ayton†, 704
 Scoring Average: Coniel Norman, 24.0 ppg
 Field Goals: Deandre Ayton†, 276
 Field Goal Attempts: Coniel Norman, 476
 Field Goal Percentage (min. 100 FG): Deandre Ayton, .612
 3-Point Field Goals: Salim Stoudamire, 73
 3-Point Field Goal Attempts: Jason Gardner, 193
 3-Point Field Goal Percentage: Khalid Reeves, .463
 Free Throws Made: Jerry Bayless, 187
 Free Throw Attempts: Derrick Williams, 232
 Free Throw Percentage: Salim Stoudamire†, .904
 Rebounds: Deandre Ayton†, 405
 Rebound Average: Deandre Ayton†, 11.6 rpg
 Assists: Russell Brown, 197
 Steals: Mike Bibby, 76
 Blocked Shots: Deandre Ayton, 66
 Games Played: Jordin Mayes/Aaron Gordon/Rondae Hollis Jefferson/Stanley Johnson, 38
 Games Started: Aaron Gordon, 38
 Minutes Played: Jason Gardner, 1,244
 Average Minutes Per Game: Jason Gardner, 36.6 mpg
 Double-Doubles (Pts/Rebs.): Deandre Ayton†, 24
 30-Point Games: Coniel Norman, 6
 20-Point Games: Deandre Ayton†, 17
 Double-Digit Scoring Games: Deandre Ayton†, 33

Note
† indicates player was also the Yearly Pac-12 Leader

Freshman single game leaders

 Points In A Game: Jerryd Bayless vs. ASU (2/10/08), 39
 Made Field Goals In A Game: Coniel Norman vs. Wyoming (2/1/73), 17
 Field Goal Attempts In A Game: Coniel Norman vs. BYU (2/24/73), 27
 Field Goal Percentage In A Game (Min. 12 attempts): Deandre Ayton at WSU (1/31/17), .917
 Made Three-Point Field Goals In A Game: 4 Players Tied at 6
 Three-Point Field Goal Attempts In A Game: Mike Bibby vs. UNC (3/29/97), 11
 Three-Point Field Goal Percentage In A Game (Min. 6 attempts): Bennedict Mathurin at .857
 Made Free Throws In A Game: Jerryd Bayless at Houston (1/12/08), 18
 Free Throw Attempts In A Game: Derrick Williams vs. Wisconsin (11/23/09), 21
 Free Throw Percentage In A Game (Min. 10 attempts): 8 Players tied at 100%
 Rebounds In A Game: Bob Elliott vs. ASU (2/2/74), 25
 Assists In A Game: Russell Brown at Utah (1/21/78), 15
 Steals In A Game: Mike Bibby vs. Texas (12/9/96), 8
 Blocks In A Game: In A Game: Grant Jerrett & Deandre Ayton, 6
 Minutes Played In A Game: Allonzo Trier at USC (1/9/16), 53
 Most Points In NCAA Debut: Eric Money vs. Cal State Bakersfield (11/29/72), 37

Note
‡ indicates player was is also single game record holder

Home court winning streaks 

^Played at Bear Down Gym

Record vs. Pac-12 opponents 
The Arizona Wildcats lead the all-time series regardless of conference affiliation vs. ten other Pac-12 opponents, trailing only UCLA.

 Total (742–415)
Note all-time series includes non-conference matchups & Pac-12 Tournament.

Pac-12 series records 
Arizona joined the former Pac-8 conference in 1978 to create the Pac-10 conference with rival Arizona State. Utah and Colorado joined the Pac-10 in 2011 to create the present Pac-12. Arizona has a winning home record over every conference opponent since joining the conference. Arizona has an overall winning record over every conference opponent other than UCLA. Since Lute Olson became head coach in 1983, Arizona had winning records over all 9 conference opponents(Colorado & Utah didn't join until 2011).  Sean Miller had winning records against 9 of the 11 opponents.

† 2020 Matchup versus Stanford was played in Santa Cruz, CA due to COVID-19 Pandemic.

Rankings
Arizona teams have spent a total of 37 weeks ranked number 1, most recently in 2015.

The Associated Press began its basketball poll on January 20, 1949. The following is a summary of those annual polls. Starting in the 1961–62 season, AP provided a preseason (PS) poll. AP did a post-tournament poll in 1953, 1954, 1974 and 1975. The following table summarizes Arizona history in the AP Poll:

 Ranked in 40 out of 75 seasons

Arizona vs. the AP Top 25 (since 1950–51)
Since the season of Arizona 1951 NCAA Division I men's basketball tournament run to the Elite 8, Arizona has played a total of 115 games against teams ranked in the AP Top 25 Poll. The Wildcats all-time record versus ranked teams is 160–190 and all-time record versus ranked teams at McKale Center is 62–38.

{| class="wikitable"

|-style="text-align:center"
|2000–01(7–5)
|#8 Illinois#18 Boston College#15 UConn #5 Illinois#2 Stanford#20 Texas#24 UCLA#1 Stanford#14 Ole Miss#4 Illinois#3 Michigan State#1 Duke
|W 79-76L 69-71L 73-81L 76-85W 71-58W 80-52L 77-79OTW 76-75W 66-56W 87-81  W 80-61 L 72–82
|-style="text-align:center"
|2001–02(10–7)
|#2 Maryland#6 Florida #23 Texas#8 Kansas#5 Illinois#23 Michigan State#18 USC#9 UCLA #25 UConn#18 Stanford#20 UCLA#25 USC#17 Stanford #21/25 California #22 USC#3 Oklahoma
|W 71–67W 75–71 W 88–74L 97–105W 87–82L 60–74W 98–70W 96–86 L 98–100OTW 88–82OTL 76–77L 89–94L 71–76W 90–78 W 90–78W 81–71L 67–78
|-style="text-align:center"
|2002–03(8–1)
|#19 Western Kentucky#8 Texas#9 Oregon#6 Kansas#20/23 California''#19 Stanford#Notre Dame#6 Kansas|W 107–68W 73–70W 81–72W 91–74W 95–80W 88–75 W 72-69W 88–71L 75–78
|-style="text-align:center"
|2003–04(2–3)
|#8 Florida#6 Texas#22 Marquette#4/2 Stanford
|L 77–78W 91–83W 85–75L 72–82L 77–80
|-style="text-align:center"
|2004–05(3–4)
|#1 Wake Forest  #15 Mississippi State#10/14 Washington  #6 Oklahoma State  #1 Illinois 
|L 60-63W 68–64W 91–82L 85-93 L 72-91W 79–78L 89–90OT
|-style="text-align:center"
|2005–06(1–8)
|#3 UConn#12 Michigan State#7 Washington#17 UCLA#25 North Carolina#13 UCLA#16 Washington#8 UCLA#4 Villanova|L 70–79L 71–74OTW 96–95OTL 79–85L 69–86L 73–84L 67–70L 59–71L 78–82
|-style="text-align:center"
|2006–07(4–9)
|#18 Memphis#20 Washington#17 Oregon#2 UCLA#6 Arizona State#4 North Carolina#17 Washington State#15 Oregon#23 USC#7 UCLA#18 Oregon
|W 79-71  W 96-87  L 77-79L 69-73W 71–47L 64-82  L 66-72 W 77-74 L 75-80L 61–54L 82–74L 66-81L 50–69
|-style="text-align:center"
|2007–08(2–6)
|#4 Kansas#9 Texas A&M#2 Memphis#6 Washington State#5 UCLA#7 Stanford#19 Washington State #4 UCLA#11 Stanford| L 72–76OT W 78–67L 63–82W 76–64L 60–82L 66–67 W 65-55  L 66-68  L 64-75
|-style="text-align:center"
|2008–09(4–5)
|#4 Gonzaga#7 UCLA#23 Washington#6 UCLA#14 Memphis#14 Arizona State#21 Washington #23 Arizona State  #25 Utah  #1 Louisville
|W 69–64L 60–83W 106–97W 84–72L 68–70L 78–87 L 56-68  W 84-71  L 64-103
|-style="text-align:center"
|2009–10(1–2)
|#24 Vanderbilt#21 UNLV#22 Washington
|L 75–71L 72-74 2OTW 87–70  
|-style="text-align:center"
|2010–11(2–4)
|#6 Kansas#18 BYU#20 Washington#8 Texas#3 Duke#9 UConn|L 79–87L 65–87L 68–85W 70–69W 93–77L 63–65
|-style="text-align:center"
|2011–12(0–1)
|#12 Florida
|L 72–78OT 
|-style="text-align:center"
|2012–13(2–2)
|#5 Florida#17 San Diego State#21 UCLA#7 Ohio State
|W 65–64W 68–67L 64–66L 70-73
|-style="text-align:center"
|2013–14(3–1)
|#6 Duke #25 Michigan#13 San Diego State #12 Wisconsin
|W 72–66 W 72-70W 70–64L 63-64
|-style="text-align:center"
|2014–15(4–1)
|#15 San Diego State#9 Gonzaga#8/13 Utah #3 Wisconsin
|W 61–59W 66–63OTW 69–51 W 63-57  L 78-85
|-style="text-align:center"
|2015–16(2–2)
|#13 Gonzaga#23 Oregon #23 USC #22 Utah #25 California 
|W 68–63L 75–83W 86–78L 64–70W 64-61
|-style="text-align:center"
|2016–17(5–3)
| #12 Michigan State  #8 Gonzaga  #3 UCLA  #13 Oregon #5/3 UCLA  #5 Oregon  #15 UNLV
| W 65–63 L 62–69W 96–85 L 58-85 L 72–77W 86–75 W 83–80W 69–60
|-style="text-align:center"
|2017–18(3–1)
|#18 Purdue#7 Texas A&M#3/25 Arizona State
| L 64–89W 67–64W 84–78W 77–70
|-style="text-align:center"
| 2018–19(0–2)
| #3 Gonzaga#8 Auburn 
| L 74–91L 57–73
|-style="text-align:center"
| 2019–20(1–4) 
|#18 Baylor#6 Gonzaga #9 Oregon#20 Colorado#14 Oregon
|L 58–63L 80-84L 73–74OTW 75–54L 72–73OT
|-style="text-align:center" 
| 2021–22(5–3)
| #4 Michigan#19 Tennessee#7/3 UCLA#19/16 USC#13 UCLA#15 Houston
| W 80–62L 73–77L 59–75W 76–66W 72–63W 91–71W 84–76L 60–72
|-style="text-align:center"
| 2022–23(6–1)
| #17 San Diego State#10 Creighton#14 Indiana#6 Tennessee#5/4/2 UCLA 
| W 87-70W 81-79W 89-75W 75-70W 58-52L 73-82  W 61-59
|-style="text-align:center"
| 2023–24(0–0)
|
|
|}

Teams in bold''' represent games Arizona played in the NCAA Division I men's basketball tournament.

Victories over AP Number 1 team

Conferences

Game day traditions 
Arizona's home games include many traditions involving The Pride of Arizona pep band and the Zona Zoo.
 Before every game, the band splits into four sections in the four sides of McKale Center. They play Bear Down Arizona in sequence before the band runs back to the student section in the north stands and plays all of Bear Down. The band also yells "Hi fans!" to the fans, who respond by yelling "Hi band!" and "Hi Tommy!" to head coach Tommy Lloyd, who responds by waving to the band. The band also yells "Hi Adia!" to Arizona women's basketball coach Adia Barnes.
 While the opposing team's players are being introduced, the student section turns their backs to the court. As each player's name is announced, they will yell "Sucks!" In the interest of sportsmanship, though, the Athletic Department is attempting to phase this tradition out.
 At the start of each half, the entire crowd will stand until the other team scores a point. The fans will also clap rhythmically with the band as it plays a four-note refrain repeatedly until the ball is tipped or inbounded.
 During the first four minutes of each half, or until the first media timeout, the band and students have several chants.
 Every time an opposing player dribbles, the yell is "Boing!"
 Every time they pass, the yell is "Pass!"
 Every time they try to shoot, the yell is "Brick!"
 When an opposing player fouls an Arizona player, the band and students chant, while pointing at the opposing player, "You! You! You! You! You! You! You! You! You! On you, that's who!" If the foul occurs during a shot and the player makes the shot, the chant is instead "Hey! Hey! Hey! Hey! No no no no! No no no no! No no no no! No no no no! Don't touch me!"
 If an opposing player accrues four fouls during the game, they will chant "Four!" four times while waving four fingers. If a player fouls out, the band plays the beat from "Another One Bites the Dust", concluding with the band and students yelling "Hey! We're gonna get you too!"
 When opposing players are attempting foul shots, besides attempting to distract the player, the band and students have several chants, but the only constant one is yelled if the player misses their first shot of a two-shot foul, in which case they yell "Nice shot, buddy!"
 If Arizona is beating an opponent by a comfortable margin late in the game, the band and students will chant "Go start the bus!" repeatedly. If an opponent makes a big play, they will chant "It just doesn't matter!"
 Beginning in the 1980s, the "Ooh Aah Man," Joe Cavaleri, made regular appearances at McKale to pump up the crowd. He would start by spelling out "A-R-I-Z-O-N-A!" with his body as the crowd chanted along. He would then direct the crowd in chanting "U of A!", first by each side of the arena, then by the north and south sides and east and west sides simultaneously then by the whole arena. His routine usually involved pulling off his shirt and pants to reveal another Arizona shirt and shorts underneath. Cavaleri was diagnosed with Parkinson's disease in 2010 and only made a few appearances during the 2010–2011 season; he officially retired from his "superfan" duties in 2013.
 At the end of every home game (and every Arizona athletics event the band is present at) the band plays Arizona's alma mater, "All Hail, Arizona!" Students and fans link arms, sway as they sing and jump up and down while singing the last part of the song.
 For a time during the Sean Miller era, the team hosted an annual "White Out" game. All fans were encouraged to wear white T-shirts. The most recent white out game was on December 7, 2013, versus UNLV. This was the fourth consecutive season to include a white out game. The tradition has not continued under Tommy Lloyd (the Arizona women's basketball program has continued to have white out games at McKale Center under coach Adia Barnes).

Facilities

Beardown Gym
Prior to playing its games at the McKale Center, Arizona played games at Bear Down Gym from 1927 until 1973.  Arizona would win its inaugural game against Arizona State, then known as Tempe State Teachers College by a score of 29-18.

McKale Center
Arizona plays its home games at McKale Center, located on the campus in Tucson, Arizona. Since moving into the McKale Center in 1973 the Arizona Wildcats men's basketball team has experienced a high winning percentage with an outstanding home court advantage.

Radio network affiliates 
The current flagship radio station for men’s basketball is Tucson sports radio station KCUB, branded as “Wildcats Radio 1290”. From 1983 until 2004, the flagship station was news/talk radio station KNST. The primary play-by-play voice of Wildcat football, baseball and men’s basketball, since 1987, is Brian Jeffries (after starting out as the color commentator for former CBS Sports announcer Ray Scott, who called Wildcats games from 1984 through the spring of 1987).

The Phoenix radio affiliate for Arizona Wildcats football and men's basketball is KGME, branded as "Fox Sports 910."

See also 
 List of NCAA Division I Men's Final Four appearances by coach
 NCAA Division I Men's Final Four appearances by school
 NCAA Division I men's basketball tournament consecutive appearances
 Arizona Wildcats women's basketball

References

External links